David Wishart Hobbs (born 9 June 1939) is a British former racing driver. He worked as a commentator from the mid 1970s for CBS until 1996, Speed from 1996 to 2012 and NBC from 2013 to 2017. In 1969 Hobbs was included in the FIA list of graded drivers, a group of 27 drivers who by their achievements were rated the best in the world. Hobbs was inducted into the Motorsports Hall of Fame of America in 2009.

Driving career
Hobbs was born, in Royal Leamington Spa, England, just months before the outbreak of World War II. His career as an international racing driver spanned 30 years at all levels including in sports cars, touring cars, Indy cars, IMSA, Can-Am and Formula One. He has participated in the Indianapolis 500 and the 24 Hours of Daytona. He made twenty starts in the 24 Hours of Le Mans race, finishing in 8th place at the first attempt in 1962, following with a pole position and a best finish of third (in 1969 and 1984) to his credit.

Hobbs was due to make his F1 Grand Prix debut for Tim Parnell Racing at the 1965 French Grand Prix at Clermont-Ferrand, but a serious road accident put him in hospital for three weeks.

In 1971 Hobbs won the L&M 5000 Continental Championship driving for Carl Hogan out of St. Louis, Missouri, in a McLaren M10B-Chevrolet. He won five of the eight rounds that year at Laguna Seca, Seattle, Road America, Edmonton and Lime Rock. Twelve years later, he would claim the 1983 Trans-Am Series championship as well. He also made two NASCAR Winston Cup starts in 1976, including leading two laps at the 1976 Daytona 500 and drove a race in the 1979 International Race of Champions.

Television commentator
Hobbs provided commentary for Formula One and GP2 races (alongside Bob Varsha and former Benetton mechanic Steve Matchett) until 2013, the SCCA Valvoline runoffs, and parts of the 24 Hours of Daytona. He has also worked for CBS on its Daytona 500 coverage, working as both a colour commentator and a feature/pit reporter from 1979 until 1996, and then moved to Speed in 1996 working as a colour commentator and then moved to NBCSN in 2013. He also worked for ESPN, serving as an analyst for their Formula 1 coverage from 1988 until 1992.

Other appearances
Hobbs appeared in the 1983 comedy film Stroker Ace, playing a TV race announcer. He also appeared in the Cars 2 movie, which premiered in June 2011, as announcer "David Hobbscap", a 1963 Jaguar from Hobbs' real life hometown in England.

Personal life

Hobbs's father, Howard Frederick Hobbs, was an Australian-born engineer and inventor who developed an early version of the automatic transmission, known as the Mecha-Matic. Colin Chapman had this transmission fitted to his Lotus Elite racecars. Hobbs lives in Vero Beach, Florida with his wife, Margaret, with whom he has two sons, Gregory and Guy. In 1986, Hobbs opened a car dealership, David Hobbs Honda, in Glendale, Wisconsin, which continues to exist today, and for which he personally voices advertisements. His youngest son, Guy, worked for Speed as a pit reporter on their sports car coverage. He is the grandfather of current racing driver Andrew Hobbs.

Racing record

Complete Formula One World Championship results
(key)

Notes
 – Formula 2 entry.

Non-Championship Formula One results
(key)

Complete British Saloon Car Championship results
(key) (Races in bold indicate pole position; races in italics indicate fastest lap.)

† Events with 2 races staged for the different classes.

Complete 24 Hours of Le Mans results

Indianapolis 500 results

NASCAR
(key) (Bold - Pole position awarded by qualifying time. Italics - Pole position earned by points standings or practice time. * – Most laps led.)

Winston Cup Series

Daytona 500

Complete Bathurst 1000 results

References

External links

 SpeedTV bio
 David Hobbs Honda
 Stats from David Hobbs' IROC and NASCAR careers on racing-reference.info
 David Hobbs – Test Driver Jaguar XJ13 – Building the Legend

English racing drivers
English Formula One drivers
European Formula Two Championship drivers
Indianapolis 500 drivers
24 Hours of Le Mans drivers
12 Hours of Reims drivers
World Sportscar Championship drivers
Lola Cars Formula One drivers
Honda Formula One drivers
Penske Formula One drivers
McLaren Formula One drivers
Bernard White Racing Formula One drivers
Tasman Series drivers
Trans-Am Series drivers
International Race of Champions drivers
NASCAR drivers
Formula One journalists and reporters
British sports broadcasters
Motorsport announcers
Sportspeople from Leamington Spa
1939 births
Living people
People from Vero Beach, Florida
British Touring Car Championship drivers
Australian Endurance Championship drivers
Team Joest drivers